Dogfaces is the term used by fans to designate the anthropomorphic characters and extras in comic books, comic strips, and animated cartoons. Dogfaces usually resemble cartoon human beings, but with some special characteristics:
 They have four digits on each hand and as few as three toes on each foot.
 They have the round black noses typical of dogs (in one Mickey Mouse comic strip, the statue of a Middle East ruler had a nose that was a giant black pearl).
 They have ears that are either pointed or droopy, like a dog's.
 They often have a prominent overbite.

The most famous dogface is probably Goofy. Bill Farmer, an actor who voices Goofy in cartoons, suggested that Goofy is "the missing link between dog and man."

Cartoonist Don Rosa apologized, tongue-in-cheek, for turning Theodore Roosevelt into a dogface for the sake of consistency in The Life and Times of Scrooge McDuck. In such cases, it may be seen as a different artistic representation of humans: in another instance, Mickey Mouse supporting character Professor Dustibones went from dogface in his first appearance, to human.

Dogheads

Long before modern comics and animation, dog-headed people (called cynocephalics, from Greek κυνοκέφαλοι (kynokephaloi), from κύων- (dog-) and κεφαλή (head)) have been depicted in art and legend in many cultures, beginning no later than ancient Egypt. Several ancient Egyptian gods, such as Anubis and Duamutef, are dogheads.

See also 
The Life and Times of Scrooge McDuck by Don Rosa

References

Comics characters
Anthropomorphic animals
Disney comics characters
American comics characters
Merrie Melodies
Tex Avery